The Good Ones is the third studio album by Canadian-American country music artist Tebey. It was released on January 22, 2021 through his label Jayward Artist Group, and distributed by Sony Music Canada, and The Orchard in the US. It includes the Top 10 Canada Country singles "Good Jeans", "The Good Ones" (with Marie-Mai), and "Happened on a Saturday Night", as well as the singles "Shotgun Rider" and "Song of the Summer".

Background
Tebey and producer Danick Dupelle had initially intended to finish recording the album in early 2020 before the COVID-19 pandemic hit. He remarked that they "couldn’t get together for several months to complete it, and it’s actually good that we didn’t", because he would never have written the single "Happened on a Saturday Night" otherwise.

Track listing

Charts

Singles

Awards and nominations

Notes

References

2021 albums
Tebey albums
Sony Music Canada albums
The Orchard (company) albums